Trinity Episcopal Church is a historic Episcopal church located at 1108 N. Adams Street in Wilmington, New Castle County, Delaware.  It was designed by architect Theophilus P. Chandler, and built in 1890.  It is constructed of grayish white "Avondale" limestone laid in random coursed rock-faced ashlar blocks in the Gothic Revival style.  It features pointed arch windows and doors, a high spire, the additional pinnacles on the side of the building, and buttresses.  The parish house and rectory were added to the church in 1911 and the chapel was added in 1949.  An adjacent brick three story rowhouse, known as Harris House, is attached to the complex by a second story walkway.

It was added to the National Register of Historic Places in 1984.

Trinity Parish operates two church buildings in Wilmington, both listed by the NRHP: the main building on North Adams, and Holy Trinity Church (Old Swedes), built in 1699, at East 7th and Church Streets.

References

Gothic Revival church buildings in Delaware
1890s architecture in the United States
Churches in Wilmington, Delaware
Churches on the National Register of Historic Places in Delaware
Episcopal church buildings in Delaware
National Register of Historic Places in Wilmington, Delaware